Augustin van den Berghe (1756 – 1836), was an 18th-century painter from the Southern Netherlands.

Biography	
He was born in Bruges and became the pupil of Joseph-Benoît Suvée in Paris in 1780. He was the father of Augustin the Younger and is known for historical allegories.

He died in Beauvais.

References	
	

Augustin van den Berghe on Artnet	
	
	
	
	
	
1756 births	
1836 deaths	
18th-century Flemish painters
Artists from Bruges
Artists from the Austrian Netherlands